The May Bumps 2006 were a set of rowing races held at Cambridge University from Wednesday 14 June 2006 to Saturday 17 June 2006. The event was run as a bumps race and was the 115th set of races in the series of May Bumps have been held annually in mid-June since 1887. In 2006, 171 crews took part (94 men's crews and 77 women's crews), with around 1500 participants in total.

Head of the River crews 

 Caius for the 5th consecutive year, their 8th since 1998.

 Pembroke women bumped Jesus on Day 1 to take their first headship since 1998.

Highest 2nd VIIIs 

 Caius II eventually bumped 1st & 3rd Trinity II on the last day to become the highest placed 2nd VIII, after a set of close races with Selwyn.

 Jesus II bumped Emmanuel II on their way to winning their blades, bumping every day to become highest 2nd women's VIII.

Links to races in other years

Bumps charts 

Below are the bumps charts for the top 3 men's and women's divisions, with the men's event on the left and women's event on the right. The bumps chart represents the progress of every crew over all four days of the racing. To follow the progress of any particular crew, simply find the crew's name on the left side of the chart and follow the line to the end-of-the-week finishing position on the right of the chart.

Note that this chart may not be displayed correctly if you are using a large font size on your browser.

The Getting-on Race 

The Getting-on Race (GoR) allows a number of crews which did not already have a place from last year's races to compete for the right to race this year. Up to ten crews are removed from the bottom of last year's finishing order, who must then race alongside new entrants to decide which crews gain a place (with one bumps place per 3 crews competing, subject to the maximum of 10 available places).

The 2006 May Bumps Getting-on Race took place on 9 June 2006.

Successful crews 

The successful crews which will compete in the bumps are (displayed in alphabetical order);

Women 

 CCAT III
 Corpus Christi II
 Emmanuel IV
 Newnham IV
 Pembroke IV
 Pembroke V (Replaced a crew that scratched)
 Trinity Hall III

Men 
 CCAT II
 Emmanuel IV
 Jesus VI
 Queens' IV
 Wolfson III

May Bumps results
May Bumps
May Bumps
May Bumps